The La Junta Tribune-Democrat is a daily newspaper serving La Junta, Colorado, United States, published Mondays through Fridays. It is owned by CherryRoad Media after being purchased from Gannett in 2021.

References

External links 
 

Newspapers published in Colorado
Otero County, Colorado